The Little AuSable river is a spring-fed stream originating in Huron County, Ontario.  It is the only stream of any size running through the township of Lucan Biddulph, a municipality whose watershed feeds the Little AuSable with pasture and field runoff.  In the summer months, the Little AuSable's flow is reduced to a trickle; in the winter, its ponds have been home to ice hockey rinks and skating lessons.

Little AuSable intersects the Ausable, just outside Biddulph Township; here, the two rivers become one as they flow towards Lake Huron.

The Little AuSable river valley north of Lucan, Ontario serves as a tribute to the stream's grander past, and is a noted spot to watch the colours of autumn.  The river's longest bridge spans this valley, allowing Highway 4 to reach Exeter.

See also  
List of rivers of Ontario

References

Rivers of Huron County, Ontario